Masters athletics is a class of the sport of athletics for athletes of over 35 years of age. The events include track and field, road running and cross country running. These are the current world records in various five-year-groups , maintained by WMA, the World Association of Masters Athletes, which is designated by the World Athletics (formerly IAAF) to conduct the worldwide sport of Masters (Veterans) Athletics (Track and Field). Starting at age 35, each age group starts on the athlete's birthday in years that are evenly divisible by 5 and extends until the next such occurrence.  For record purposes, older athletes are not included in younger age groups, except in the case of relay team members.  A relay team's age group is determined by the age of the youngest member.

Some Masters events (hurdles, throwing implements) have modified specifications.  The combined events use an age-graded result applied against the standard scoring table.

Key to tables below:

Men

100 metres

200 metres

400 metres

800 metres

1500 metres

Mile

3000 metres

5000 metres

10000 metres

Marathon

80 metres hurdles

100 metres hurdles

110 metres hurdles

200 metres hurdles

300 metres hurdles

400 metres hurdles

2000 metres steeplechase

3000 metres steeplechase

High jump
progression of masters high jump records

Pole vault

Long jump

Triple jump
progression of masters triple jump records

Shot put

Discus throw

Hammer throw

Javelin throw

Weight throw

Decathlon
Note: per 1-1-2023 new scorings are in use, scorings from 2010/2014 are given between brackets.

Throws Pentathlon
Note: per 1-1-2023 new scorings are in use, scorings from 2010/2014 are given between brackets.

4×100 metres relay

4×400 metres relay

4×800 metres relay

5000 metres race walk

Women

100 metres

200 metres

400 metres

800 metres

1500 metres

Mile

3000 metres

5000 metres

10000 metres

Marathon

80 metres hurdles

100 metres hurdles

200 metres hurdles

300 metres hurdles

400 metres hurdles

2000 metres steeplechase

3000 metres steeplechase

High jump

Pole vault

Long jump

Triple jump

Shot put

Discus throw

Hammer throw

Javelin throw
Effective the 2014 season, WMA increased the weight of the javelin for women 60–75.  Until the records of the lighter implements are surpassed, two records are officially kept.

Weight throw

Throws Pentathlon
Note: per 1-1-2023 new scorings are in use, scorings from 2010/2014 are given between brackets. Effective the 2014 season, WMA had increased the weight of the javelin for women 60–75. Per 2023 records with old implements are no longer official.

Heptathlon
Note: per 1-1-2023 new scorings are in use, scorings from 2010/2014 are given between brackets. Effective the 2014 season, WMA had increased the weight of the javelin for women 60–75. Per 2023 records with old implements are no longer official.

4×100 metres relay

4×400 metres relay

4×800 metres relay

3000 metres race walk

5000 metres race walk

See also
List of Masters records in Road Running
List of centenarian masters track and field records
List of European records in masters athletics
United States records in masters athletics

Notes

References

Sources
WMA records – Men Outdoor 2 February 2023 updated
WMA records – Women Outdoor 3 February 2023 updated
WMA Decathlon records 2 January 2023 updated
WMA Heptathlon records 2 January 2023 updated
WMA Throws Pentathlon records – Men 2 January 2023 updated 
WMA Throws Pentathlon records – Women 2 January 2023 updated
WMA records non stadia – Men 2 January 2023 updated
WMA records non stadia – Women 2 January 2023 updated
WMA records – Men Indoor 1 March 2023
WMA records – Women Indoor 1 March 2023

External links
World Masters Athletics - Records
Masters Athletics All Time World Rankings (unofficial)
American Masters Outdoor Track & Field Records
Veterans Decathlon Records

Masters
World records